Mijakovce is a village in Vranje municipality, Pčinja District, Serbia. In 2002 the village had a population of 37. In 1991, the population was 73.

References 

Populated places in Serbia